Nicolas Mahut and Pierre-Hugues Herbert defeated Alexander Bublik and Andrey Golubev in the final, 4–6, 7–6(7–1), 6–4, to win the men's doubles title at the 2021 French Open. It was their second French Open title and fifth major title together. They saved match points in their semifinal match against Juan Sebastián Cabal and Robert Farah. Bublik and Golubev became the first male Kazakh players to reach a major final.

Kevin Krawietz and Andreas Mies were the two-time defending champions, but Mies did not participate due to injury. Krawietz played alongside Horia Tecău, but they lost in the quarterfinals to Cabal and Farah.

Hugo Nys became the first ever Monegasque player to reach the quarterfinals of a Grand Slam event.

Seeds

Draw

Finals

Top half

Section 1

Section 2

Bottom half

Section 3

Section 4

Other entry information

Wild cards

Protected ranking

Alternate pairs

Withdrawals
Before the tournament
  Feliciano López /  Jaume Munar → replaced by  Pablo Cuevas /  Guido Pella
  Nikola Mektić /  Mate Pavić → replaced by  Pablo Andújar /  Pedro Martínez
  John Millman /  Thiago Monteiro → replaced by  Julian Knowle /  David Pel

During the tournament
  Marcelo Arévalo /  Matwé Middelkoop

References

External links
Main draw
2021 French Open – Men's doubles draws at the Roland Garros

French Open - Doubles
Men's Doubles